Only Time Will Tell is the name of the debut studio album by the Latin freestyle singer Sandeé. It was released in 1991, by RAL Records/Fever Records.

Track listing

Charts

Singles - Billboard (North America)

References

1991 albums
Sandeé albums